The following is a list of episodes for the BBC One sitcom After You’ve Gone. The first episode aired on 12 January 2007, and the last on 21 December 2008. BBC One commissioned a fourth series and a third Christmas special for broadcast in 2009, but cancelled them in November 2008. All 25 episodes of the series were broadcast on Friday evenings, with most episodes airing at 8:30pm. All 25 episodes are 30 minutes long, with the exception of the 2008 Christmas special, which is 45 minutes.

Series overview

Episodes

Series 1 (2007)

Series 2 (2007)

Series 3 (2008)

References

External links
 
 After You've Gone – list of episodes on British Comedy Guide
 

Lists of British sitcom episodes